John the Saracen (Iohannes Saracenus) may refer to:
John Sarrazin (John the Saracen), 12th-century translator of Greek texts into Latin
John the Saracen (chamberlain), servant of Louis IX of France
John the Saracen (archbishop of Bari), ruled 1259–80
John the Moor (John the Saracen), chamberlain of the Holy Roman Empire under Frederick II
John Saracenus, papal subdeacon and chaplain, dean of Wells (1245–48)
John the Saracen, procurator of the convent of Saint-Maur-des-Fossés at Rome 1253
John the Saracen, papal subdeacon and magister, canon of Limoges in 1253